João Camilo de Oliveira Torres (July 31, 1915 – January 31, 1973) was a Brazilian writer, professor, historian and journalist.

Torres was a major figure of Conservatism in Brazil.

Biography 
Torres graduated in philosophy from the National Faculty of Philosophy (FNFi), successor of the UDF, extinguished when his brother Luís Camilo de Oliveira Neto was vice-rector in office (1939). He began writing for newspapers in 1937. Five years later he was professor of Moral Philosophy at the Faculty of Philosophy of UFMG and History of Brazil at The Santa Maria College (now PUC-Minas), also of Belo Horizonte.

Torres was a professor at the Pontifical Catholic University of Minas Gerais, the Federal University of Minas Gerais and the Minas Gerais University, and was a member of the Minas Gerais Academy of Letters (chair no. 39), of the Minas Gerais Institute of Geography and History, Minas Gerais Council of Culture. A career employee of the IAPC, he died at his desk as superintendent of the INPS.

Books 
In Portuguese.
 . Livraria Cultura Brasileira, Belo Horizonte, 1944 (1ª ed.) e Autentica, Belo Horizonte, 2011 (2ª ed.)
 . Editora Vozes, Petrópolis, 1943 (1ª ed.) e 1957 (2ª ed.), 
 . Casa do Estudante, Rio de Janeiro, 1949.
  . Ed. Dialogo, Belo Horizonte, 1954.
 . José Olympio, Rio de Janeiro, 1957 (1ª ed.) e Editora Vozes, Petrópolis, 1964 (2ª ed.) e Edições Câmara, DF, 2017 (3ª ed.), 
 . Editora Vozes, Petrópolis, 1958.
 . Editora Vozes, Petrópolis, 1958.
 . Ed. R. B. E. P., Belo Horizonte, 1959.
 . Ed. R. B. E. P., Belo Horizonte, 1959.
 . Difusão Pan-Americana do livro, Belo Horizonte, 1961-1962 (1ª ed.) e 1967 (2ª ed.)
 . Coleção Brasiliana, Cia. Editora Nacional, São Paulo, 1961. 
  (conto para crianças). Editora do Brasil S/A, São Paulo, 1961.
 . Herder, Ed. e Livraria Ltda., São Paulo, 1961.
 . Itatiaia, Belo Horizonte, 1962.
  Itatiaia, Belo Horizonte, 1962.
  . Coleções Brasílica, Edições "O Cruzeiro", Rio de Janeiro, 1962.
 . Editora Vozes, Petrópolis, 1962.
 . Editora Vozes, Petrópolis, 1963.
  (para a juventude). Distribuidora Record, Rio de Janeiro, 1963.
  (para a juventude). Distribuidora Record, Rio de Janeiro, 1963 (1ª ed.) e 1967 (2ª ed.)
 . Editora Vozes, Petrópolis, 1964.
  (para a juventude). Distribuidora Record, Rio de Janeiro, 1964.
  (para a juventude). Distribuidora Record, Rio de Janeiro, 1964.
  (para a juventude). Distribuidora Record, Rio de Janeiro, 1964.
 . Difel, São Paulo, 1965. 
  . FTD, São Paulo, 1965.
 . Ed. G. R. D., Rio de Janeiro, 1965.
  Mec, Brasília, 1967
  Ed. Júpiter, Belo Horizonte, 1968.
 . Editora Vozes, Petrópolis, 1968.
 . Ed. Júpiter, Belo Horizonte, 1968.
 . Coleção Brasiliana, Cia. Editora Nacional, São Paulo, 1968. 
  .Ed. Grijalbo, São Paulo, 1968
  Editora Vozes, Petrópolis, 1968.
  José Olympio, Rio de Janeiro, 1969. 
 . Ed. Agir, Rio de Janeiro, 1969.
 . Ed. do autor, Belo Horizonte, 1971.
 . Editora IBRASA, São Paulo, 1981.
 . Arcádia Editora, São Paulo, 2017.

References 

Brazilian historians
Brazilian anti-communists
People from Minas Gerais
1915 births
1973 deaths